Amy Sol (born 1981) is an American artist of Korean ancestry, who lives in Las Vegas, Nevada. She is a member in good standing of a loose knit community of artists practicing Pop Surreal, Lowbrow, or, as Robert Williams defines it, "cartoon-tainted abstract surrealism." She typically paints upon treated wooden panel, incorporating the grain of the wood into the painting. Her style integrates both narrative and figurative styles with the mystic.

Sol's works are characterized by young maidens in dream-like nature settings with oversized or sometimes fanciful creatures. One gets a sense that the girls are interacting with the animals as mythic partners or perhaps "familiars." There is no indication that these animals are pets; rather friends or perhaps partners. The exotic landscapes include plants, impossible trees, mist & fog, clouds, flowers, and rolling hills. With a muted palette of pastels and washed out grays; her style is influenced by folk-art, contemporary illustration, manga, and modern design.

Sol has named Range Murata and Kay Nielsen among others as inspirations for her work.

References

External links
 Official Site
 Official Blog
 Official Twitter
 "Works of Water & Smoke" Show Rome, Italy
 Mondo Bizzarro Gallery 

Living people
1981 births
Artists from Nevada
People from Las Vegas
American women painters
American artists of Korean descent
American people of Korean descent
21st-century American women artists